Brian George (born 1 July 1952) is a British actor. He is best known for his roles as Pakistani restaurateur Babu Bhatt in Seinfeld (1989–1998), the Indian gynecologist father of Raj Koothrappali in The Big Bang Theory (2007–2019), the voice of Chutney in Father of the Pride (2004–2005), and spiritual guide Guru Pathik in Avatar: The Last Airbender (2005–2008).

Early life
George was born on 1 July 1952 in Jerusalem to Baghdadi Jewish (Iraqi Jewish) parents, who had immigrated to Israel. His father was born in Lebanon and grew up in Bombay, India in a multi religious family, with his half sister being Muslim. His mother was born in India. A year after his birth, the family moved from Israel to London and then, in 1966, to Toronto, Ontario, Canada. George is the youngest of four siblings.

He attended an all-boys school in London but made the switch to a public co-ed high school when the family moved to Toronto. He attended the University of Toronto, where he was active in theatre productions. He left before graduation and formed a theatre group. When it failed to succeed, he moved on to join the Second City, where he trained with John Candy, among others.

Career
George appeared as a United Nations secretary in Austin Powers: International Man of Mystery, as Julian Bashir's father in the Star Trek: Deep Space Nine episode "Doctor Bashir, I Presume?", and on a recurring basis as Raj's father in The Big Bang Theory. In 2006, he landed a recurring role as Sasan's father Omid in So NoTORIous. He also provided the voice of Bob Fish in the last two series of Bob and Margaret.

He appeared on numerous other sitcoms, including three episodes of Seinfeld as Pakistani immigrant Babu Bhatt, who is deported to Pakistan when Elaine Benes fails to give Jerry Seinfeld his mail, which contains Babu's visa application, in time. George returned in the series' finale. He also appeared in two episodes of Ellen as Ranjit, a member of the book club that gathers in Ellen's book shop.

He had a recurring role as newsman Hugh Persons on Doctor, Doctor during its second season.

He made a guest appearance in the first season of Gene Roddenberry's Andromeda as Wayist religious leader Vikram Singh Khalsa. He also appeared in One Tree Hill as Brooke's taxi driver when she goes to launch her clothes line in New York.

George has done voiceover work in animated shows such as Batman: The Animated Series (as musician turned gangster Jimmy "The Jazzman" Peake); Handy Manny; Kim Possible as antagonist Duff Killigan, a Scotsman who uses exploding golf balls when attacking Kim and Ron Stoppable, Kim's sidekick; Avatar: The Last Airbender as Guru Pathik; Batman Beyond; Justice League (voicing Parasite, in a style similar to the first voice actor of Parasite, Brion James), Morgan Edge and President George W. Bush), MASK, Invader Zim, and Jedi Master Ki-Adi Mundi in Season 2 of Star Wars: The Clone Wars. He has also appeared in video games like Star Wars: Knights of the Old Republic, Baldur's Gate, Ultimate Spider-Man, Mass Effect 3, EverQuest II and Final Fantasy XIV. Early in his acting career, he was among the cast of 1985's The Care Bears Movie, and made guest appearances in the Canadian television series The Edison Twins, The Littlest Hobo, Comedy Factory and King of Kensington.

He also took over the voice of Bob Fish in the Anglo-Canadian animated comedy series Bob and Margaret and Pugg in the 1993 revival series of The Pink Panther. He played a guru in the film Inspector Gadget who trains with Inspector Gadget.

He also made a small guest appearance in the second season of The Mentalist in episode 16 entitled "Code Red". He played a professor working at the Northern California Technology Institute.
His other appearances include the role of Mr. Pashmutt on Desperate Housewives (in the 2005 episode "You Could Drive a Person Crazy") and Ali on American Dad! (in the 2005 episode "Stan of Arabia: Part 2"). He also appeared on The 4400 in the third-season episode "The Starzl Mutation". Also appeared in the St. Valentine's Day episode of Grey's Anatomy as a carrier waiter in love with another patient.

He also voiced Sahin the Falcon and Stuart Black in Age of Empires III. He plays a short tempered convenience store owner in the 2001 film Ghost World. He also plays the role of "Iqbal" in the 2006 film Employee of the Month. He also voiced Captain Barbossa in the video game Kingdom Hearts II, a role he would reprise in Pirates of the Caribbean: The Legend of Jack Sparrow, Pirates of the Caribbean: At World's End, Disney Infinity, and Kingdom Hearts III.

He played "Pushpop", an Indian ice cream vendor, in the 2001 film Bubble Boy. He also played the culturally diverse (Sikh-Catholic-Muslim mix with Jewish in-laws) bartender who counselled the priest played by Edward Norton through a crisis of faith in the 2000 film Keeping the Faith. In the 2008 indie romantic comedy Shades of Ray, he played the overbearing Pakistani father to a half-Pakistani, half-Caucasian (Zachary Levi) in the midst of questioning his prior policy of only dating white women.

He also was the foster father of Ricky in the television series The Secret Life of the American Teenager.

In The Penguins of Madagascar, George guest stars as the zoo doctor in "Needle Point", "I Was a Penguin Zombie", "Operation: Cooties", "Love Hurts", and "I Know Why the Caged Bird Goes Insane".

He also appeared on Disney Channel show That's So Raven as Dr. Sleevemore, a "psychic doctor" who treats Raven's vision-related problems. He appeared in 2 episodes.

He also appeared on the Disney Channel show Phineas and Ferb on the hour long special "Summer Belongs To You" as Uncle Sabu, voiced Mr. Kumar on the Disney Junior show Handy Manny, and voiced a character on the Disney Channel show Mickey Mouse.

He regularly voiced several characters on DC Nation's Green Lantern: The Animated Series, including Appa Ali Apsa, LANOS, and Brother Warth.

He also appeared in the first episode of Beware the Batman, "Hunted", as the villain Professor Pyg, and in Sly Cooper: Thieves in Time as Sly's ancestor, Salim Al-Kupar.

In 2013, George took up a recurring role in Once Upon a Time in Wonderland as an unnamed prisoner who is later revealed to be the Sultan of Agrabah and father of the show's principal antagonist: Jafar.

He guest starred in SpongeBob SquarePants in the episode "Drive Happy" as Coupe, an arrogant and sarcastic sentient car that SpongeBob buys.

He also had a featured role in the Uttera Singh-directed comedy short film Fanny Pack.

After 12 years, he reprised his role as Doctor Sleevmore in the That's So Raven spin-off Raven's Home for a three episode special.

Filmography

Film

Television

Live-action performances

Voice performances

Video games

References

External links
 

1952 births
Living people
Baghdadi Jews
English emigrants to the United States
English expatriates in Canada
English male film actors
English male television actors
English male video game actors
English male voice actors
English people of Iraqi-Jewish descent
English people of Israeli descent
English people of Indian-Jewish descent
Israeli emigrants to the United Kingdom
Israeli emigrants to the United States
Israeli emigrants to Canada
Israeli male film actors
Israeli male television actors
Israeli male voice actors
Israeli people of Iraqi-Jewish descent
Israeli people of Indian-Jewish descent
Israeli people of Indian descent
Jewish English male actors
Jewish Israeli male actors
Male actors from Jerusalem
Male actors from London
Male actors from Toronto
20th-century English male actors
21st-century English male actors
20th-century Israeli male actors